J’Nai Bridges is a two time Grammy-Award winning American mezzo-soprano. She is a winner of the Marian Anderson Award and has performed for the Metropolitan Opera, Washington National Opera, and San Francisco Opera. BET has described her as The Beyoncé of opera.

Early life and education 
Bridges grew up in Lakewood, Washington, and attended high school at the Charles Wright Academy in Tacoma. Her focus was originally on basketball, but she became interested in singing after taking choir as an elective. After deciding to focus on music, she attended the Manhattan School of Music and then the Curtis Institute of Music in Philadelphia for graduate school. While participating in a young artists' program at the Lyric Opera of Chicago, she was mentored by Renée Fleming.

Career 
She names Black opera stars Denyce Graves, Shirley Verrett, Kathleen Battle, and Jessye Norman, at whose funeral she sang, as inspirations.

Bridges sang at the Kennedy Center for the first time after winning a 2012 Marian Anderson Award. She competed in the BBC Cardiff Singer of the World competition in 2015. She performed at the Los Angeles Opera in November 2016 as Nefertiti in Akhnaten by Philip Glass. In 2017, she performed the role of Josefa Segovia in the premiere of John Adams's Girls of the Golden West at San Francisco Opera., and in the 2019 European debut of the opera at the Dutch National Opera in Amsterdam.  In June 2019, she returned to San Francisco for the title role in Bizet's Carmen. She made her Metropolitan Opera debut reprising her role in Akhnaten in November 2019, and her Washington National Opera debut as Delilah in Samson and Delilah by Saint-Saëns in March 2020.

The COVID-19 pandemic put her on-stage career on hold in favor of virtual programing. After the murder of George Floyd, she proposed and led an online panel of Black opera singers with Los Angeles Opera. She returned to the stage in January 2022 for Palm Beach Opera's production of Carmen.

In March 2022 she performed with the National Philharmonic in composer Adolphus Hailstork and librettist Herbert Martin's new work "A Knee on the Neck," a tribute to George Floyd. Critic Michael Andor Brodeur wrote that Bridges was "especially gripping" in the performance.

Awards

References

External links

"A Met Opera Star Was Born, 'Then Everything Stopped' " by Anthony Tommasini, The New York Times, June 26, 2020

Living people
Year of birth missing (living people)
American operatic mezzo-sopranos
Manhattan School of Music alumni
Curtis Institute of Music alumni
21st-century African-American women singers
21st-century American women opera singers
African-American women opera singers
Grammy Award winners